Vemulawada Bheemakavi is a 1976 Indian Telugu-language biographical film, produced by N. T. Rama Rao under his Ramakrishna Cine Studios banner and directed by D. Yoganand. It stars N. T. Rama Rao, Nandamuri Balakrishna  and music composed by Pendyala Nageswara Rao.

Plot
The story is based on the life of the 9th century famous Telugu poet Vemulawada Bheemakavi. Wherever society is spoilt by superstitions, crime levels increase in the name of religion, and great people are born to protect the piety and reform the society. One among them is Vemulawada Bheemakavi. The story begins with Machamma, a child widow, her husband, an old man, marries her for sake of children, but dies before his wish is fulfilled. Machamma lives in her brother's house like a slave. Machamma once goes to Bhimeshwara temple in Vemulawada and innocently prays to him to fulfill her husband's wish. Bhimeshwara feels happy about her innocent wish and promises her that she will give birth to a baby boy. When Machamma becomes pregnant, society rejects her, and she gives birth to Bheemakavi. Society casts out Bheemakavi and he could not get any education. He observes himself and also fellow outcasts and their plights. He says all are humans and to be treated equally and starts debating in the streets and the people used to abuse him as an illegal child.  Once he goes to Kaalipuja and he is thrown out. Bheema asks his mother to tell him about his father, she replies to go and ask Lord Bhimeshwara. Bhima goes to the temple and asks God and warns if he is not going, to tell the truth, he will commit suicide before him. Lord Siva appears, tells him that he is the gift given to his mother by god, and gives him a boon that Whatever he says becomes True. Bheema comes to the ritual ground, recites a poem, and says that Rice becomes lime, Appam sweet becomes a frog and it happens. All poets and priests fall on his feet, agree that Machamma is a noble lady, and take them into their societies' fold. Bheemakavi visits many kingdoms and makes miracles. In a kingdom, the King dies before crowning his son Kalinga Gangu. There arises a lot of criminal elements which create unrest in the kingdom. People revolt and attempt to murder Kalinga Gangu. At this juncture, Bheemakavi enters the king's court. But the king asks him to come later. Bhimakavi becomes angry and curses that he will lose his kingdom in 32 days and it happens. After some time, Bheemakavi sees Kalinga Gangu on the streets, sympathizes with him, and assures him that he will get back to his kingdom by the next full moon day. The rest of the story is about how it happens.

Cast
N. T. Rama Rao
Nandamuri Balakrishna
Satyanarayana
Rajanala  
Kanta Rao
Thyagaraju 
Raavi Kondala Rao
K. V. Chalam
K. K. Sarma
Shavukaru Janaki 
Vijayalalitha 
Girija
Hemalatha

Soundtrack

Music composed by Pendyala Nageswara Rao. Lyrics were written by C. Narayana Reddy. Music released on AVM Audio Company.

References

Films scored by Pendyala Nageswara Rao
1970s Telugu-language films
Films directed by D. Yoganand